Hill's shrew (Crocidura hilliana) is a species of mammal in the family Soricidae. It is found in Thailand and Laos.

References

Hill's shrew
Mammals of Laos
Mammals of Thailand
Hill's shrew